Penn may refer to:

Places
England
 Penn, Buckinghamshire
 Penn, West Midlands

United States
 Penn, North Dakota
 Penn, Oregon
 Pennsylvania
 Penn, Pennsylvania
 Penn Lake Park, Pennsylvania
 Penn Township (disambiguation), several municipalities

Australia
 Penn, South Australia was the name for the town now known as Oodla Wirra before 1940

Education 
 University of Pennsylvania, U.S., known as "Penn" or "UPenn"
Penn Quakers the athletic teams of the university
 Penn High School, Indiana, U.S.

People
Surname
 Abram Penn (1743–1801), noted landowner and Revolutionary War officer from Virginia
 Alexander Penn Wooldridge (1847–1930), American mayor of Austin, Texas from 1909 to 1919
 Alexander Penn (1906–1972), Israeli poet
 Arthur Penn, American film director and producer
 Arthur Horace Penn (1886–1960), member of the British Royal Household
 Audrey Penn, American children's author
 B.J. Penn (born 1978), American mixed martial arts fighter
 Claire Penn (born 1951), South African speech and language pathologist
 Dan Penn, American musician
 Eric Penn (1878–1915), English cricketer
 Hannah Callowhill Penn, wife of William Penn
 Harry Penn, civil rights activist and African-American dentist
 Irving Penn, an American photographer 
 John Penn (architect) (1921–2007), a British architect  
 John Penn (Conservative politician) (1848–1903), MP for Lewisham 1891–1903
 John Penn (North Carolina politician) (1741–1788), Continental Congressman from North Carolina and signer of the United States Declaration of Independence
 John Penn (engineer) (1805–1878), British marine engine engineer, invented lignum vitae bearing for propeller shafts, twice president of the Institution of Mechanical Engineers
 John Penn (governor) (1729–1795), a lieutenant governor and later proprietor of colonial Pennsylvania
 John Penn (writer) (1760–1834), son of Thomas Penn
 Kal Penn (born 1977), American actor and public servant
 An American entertainment family:
 Leo Penn (1921–1998), actor
 Michael Penn (born 1958), son of Leo; singer-songwriter
 Sean Penn (born 1960), son of Leo; actor
 Chris Penn (1965–2006), son of Leo; actor
 Robin Wright (born 1966), actress; sometime known as Robin Wright Penn, former wife of Sean
 Mark Penn, American public relations CEO and campaign strategist
 Osnat Penn, Israeli computational biologist
 Robert Penn, African-American sailor, recipient of the Medal of Honor during the Spanish–American War
 Russell Penn (born 1985), English footballer
 Steve Penn (born 1968), American handball player
 William Penn (1644–1718), founder of Pennsylvania
 John Penn ("the American") (1700–1746), son of William Penn
 Springett Penn (I), the second son of William Penn, founder of Pennsylvania
 Springett Penn (II), son of William Penn, Jr. and a grandson and heir of William Penn
 William Penn Jr., son of William Penn
 William Penn (Royal Navy officer), English admiral
 Zak Penn, American screenwriter

Given name
 Penn Badgley, American actor best known for his role as Dan Humphrey on the TV series Gossip Girl
 Penn Jillette, member of the comedy and magic duo Penn & Teller
 Penn Kemp, Canadian poet and playwright
 Penn Murfee, American baseball player

Media
 Penn (film), 1954 Tamil film starring Vyjayanthimala
 Penn (TV series), a 1991 Tamil mini-series
 Penn (TV series), a 2006 Tamil-language soap opera

Other 
 Penn (automobile), manufactured in Pittsburgh from 1910 until 1913
 Penn Club of New York City, located in New York City
 Penn Entertainment (Nasdaq: PENN), American operator of casinos and racetracks
 Penn FC, a soccer club based in Harrisburg, Pennsylvania
 The Penn, or The Stylus, a would-be periodical owned and edited by Edgar Allan Poe
 Penn Racquet Sports, a ball manufacturer
 Penn Reels, an American manufacturer of fishing tackle, a division of Jarden

See also
 Pen (disambiguation)
 Penn Square (disambiguation)